Elys may refer to:

People
 Elys Dolan, British children's book writer and illustrator
 Elys Guzmán, a member of the Dominican Republic men's national basketball team in 2006
 Elys Ventura (born 2001), New Zealand tennis player
 Cipriano Elys (1907–1984), Spanish racing cyclist
 Edmund Elys (c. 1633–1708), English clergyman, poet and writer

Other uses
 Elys, Kentucky, United States, a former unincorporated community and coal town
 Elys, the Morleys Stores store in Wimbledon
 ELYS, a protein encoded in humans by the AHCTF1 gene

See also
 Elis (disambiguation)
 Ellis (disambiguation)